Carl Paaske (29 July 1890 – 7 June 1970) was a Norwegian modern pentathlete. He competed at the 1912 Summer Olympics.

References

1890 births
1970 deaths
Norwegian male modern pentathletes
Modern pentathletes at the 1912 Summer Olympics
Olympic modern pentathletes of Norway
Sportspeople from Oslo